Miru or Meroo is a village in the Leh district of Ladakh, India. It is located in the Kharu tehsil. The Leh–Manali Highway passes through Miru.

Demographics 
According to the 2011 census of India, Miru has 34 households. The effective literacy rate (i.e. the literacy rate of population excluding children aged 6 and below) is 56.6%.

See also
 Kharoo
 Geography of Ladakh
 Tourism in Ladakh

References 

Villages in Kharu tehsil